Maja Stogut is a sharp mountain in the crest of the Accursed Mountains range in Albania in the south of the Dinaric Alps, about 4.5 km southeast of the village Nikç. Maja Stogut is known in the area for its high limestone pillar which rises to 2,246m above mean sea level.

References

External links
Summitpost, Maja a Stogut

Mountains of Albania
Accursed Mountains